Burgabo is a port town in Lower Jubba province in southern Somalia near the border with Kenya. Other names and variants of the town include Berikau, Bircao, Birikao, Birikau, Bur Gabo, Bur Gao, Bur Gavo, Hohenzollernhafen, Port Dunford, Port Durnford and Wubushi.

The connections with the sparsely populated inland and towards the north consist of barely accessible paths. Offshore are reefs and the Bajuni Islands, which extend northeastward to Kismayo.

On the northern edge of the town, there are extensive charcoal storage sites; charcoal is produced in the hinterland and exported from Burgabo to the Arabian Peninsula via dhow.  This export is banned by the United Nations Security Council because the Islamic terror group Al-Shabaab is financed by the proceeds.

The dry season is from January to March, followed by a rainy season from April to July. After that, rainfall regularly falls with a small peak in October. The annual fluctuations can also be considerable.

History

Greco-Roman
The area is believed to correspond with the ancient emporium of Nikon, which is described in the 1st century CE Greco-Roman travelogue the Periplus of the Erythraean Sea.

The archaeological site (known by the early 20th century name Port Dunford) contains a number of ancient ruins, including several pillar tombs. Prior to its collapse, one these structures' pillars stood 11 meters high from the ground, making it the tallest tower of its kind in the wider region.

Additionally, the area features a square edifice covered with a low, dome-shaped vault. It is one of the main local standing structures.

In 1913, Haywood reportedly found at Port Dunford a large collection of old coins, along with a vessel similar to a Greek amphora. He later disposed of the amphora pieces, and the vessel was also said to have been crushed during a storm. In 1930, Hayward showed the coins to an official with the British Museum, H. Mattingly. 87 pieces in total, they ranged in date from the 3rd century BCE to the early 4th century CE. Among the coins were 17 copper mints from the Ptolemy III to Ptolemy V dynasties of Ptolemaic Egypt, five pieces of uncertain origin dating from the 1st to 3rd centuries BCE, six pieces that had been minted under Imperial Rome between the reigns of Nero and Antoninus Pius, forty-six coins ranging from Roman Emperors Maximinus II to Constans, six mints derived from the Egyptian Mamluk Sultanate, and seven pieces from Ottoman Egypt.

Early trading
Based on the archaeological finds, Mortimer Wheeler suggested that Port Dunford was likely a trading station from at least the Roman period. In 1955, he and Dr. A.G. Mathew in turn visited the area. They discovered porcelain, pottery and building remains dating from the 16th century onwards.

19th century

Following an agreement between the German East Africa Company and Sultan Ali ibn Ismail of Kismayo at the end of 1886, a German trading station called Hohenzollernhafen was established at Wubushi (Burgabo) Bay.  At that time, the entire southern part of the Somali coast was nominally in the hands of the Sultanate of Zanzibar, but the Germans circumvented that problem by concluding a protection treaty with Ali ibn Ismail, who was hostile to Zanzibar.

After the Heligoland–Zanzibar Treaty of 1890, the area came under British suzerainty and the port was renamed Port Durnford (also Port Dunford or Wubushi).

20th century
In 1905, the area was described as follows:

Port Durnford formed part of the East Africa Protectorate (first part of Tanaland province and later Jubaland) until, along with the rest of Jubaland, was ceded to the Italians in 1924 when it became known as Bur Gavo.  First part of Trans-Juba, it became part of Italian Somaliland in 1926 and, with independence in 1960, part of Somalia.

21st century
At the beginning of the 21st century, the town numbered just under 4,000 residents, similar to the population at the start of the 20th century (about 3,500 residents). In the Somali Civil War, the city was a haven for various Islamist groups, and the population fell to around 300 in 2011.  Expeditionary Kenya Defence Forces and Somali Armed Forces of the Federal Government of Somalia, supported by French naval artillery and U.S. air strikes, occupied the area of Burgabo at the end of October 2011 in the campaign against Al-Shabaab terrorists.

See also
Nikon
Sarapion
Somali aristocratic and court titles

Notes

References

External links
 Detailed topographical map of the Burgabo area

Populated places in Lower Juba
Populated coastal places in Somalia
Populated places established in 1886
Archaeological sites of Eastern Africa